The Rockford Public School system serves an area of approximately  centered on Rockford, Michigan.

History 

Rockford Public Schools serves portions of Kent County, and serves portions of Plainfield, Algoma, Courtland, Cannon, Grattan and Oakfield Townships.

The modern school system was formed in the late 1950s by combining various neighborhood school systems.  As of 2008, Rockford Public Schools serves over 8,000 students.

Erwin J. Kleinert became superintendent in 1940 and was instrumental in consolidating many of the one-room school districts into Rockford Public Schools.  He remained as superintendent until 1962, when he then became superintendent of Kent County Intermediate School District.  Through Mr. Kleinert's visionary leadership, Rockford Public Schools became one of Michigan's most progressive school districts, offering innovative programs for special-needs students, college-preparatory programs, and parent advisory boards.  These programs stimulated neighboring community school districts to emulate Rockford, and helped establish western Michigan as a vanguard in the educational reform that was to follow in the 1970s.

Schools 
Each school in the district is part of the national Blue Ribbon Schools Program.

Elementary Schools (K-5)

Belmont Elementary
Cannonsburg Elementary
Crestwood Elementary
Lakes Elementary
Meadow Ridge Elementary
Parkside Elementary
Roguewood Elementary
Valley View Elementary

Secondary

East Rockford Middle School (Grades 6-8); students residing in Cannon, Courtland, Grattan and Oakfield Townships attend.
North Rockford Middle School Grades 6-8); students residing in the city of Rockford, and Plainfield and Algoma Townships attend.
Rockford Freshman Center (Grade 9)
Rockford High School (Grades 10-12)

Alternative

River Valley Academy (9-12)

References

External links 

 Rockford Public Schools official homepage

School districts in Michigan
Education in Kent County, Michigan
1950s establishments in Michigan
School districts established in the 1950s